José Antonio González Linares (born 25 February 1946 in San Felices de Buelna) is a Spanish former road bicycle racer. He competed in the team time trial at the 1968 Summer Olympics.

Major results

1967
Vuelta Ciclista a Navarra
1970
GP Ciudad de Vitoria
GP Nuestra Senora de Oro
 Spanish National Road Race Championship
Tour de France:
Winner stage 7B
1971
Vuelta a España:
Winner stage 11B
1972
Vuelta a España:
Winner stage 17B
Tour of the Basque Country
1973
Vuelta a Levante
1975
Tour of the Basque Country
1976
Larado
Madrid
Vuelta a España:
Winner stage 10
1977
GP Pascuas
Tour of the Basque Country
1978
Tour of the Basque Country

Notes

References

External links
 
 
 
 
 

1946 births
Living people
People from the Besaya Valley
Cyclists from Cantabria
Spanish male cyclists
Regionalist Party of Cantabria politicians
Spanish Tour de France stage winners
Spanish Vuelta a España stage winners
Olympic cyclists of Spain
Cyclists at the 1968 Summer Olympics